The Oxnard Union High School District (OUHSD) is a union high school district in Ventura County, California. The district serves students in grades 9–12 on the Oxnard Plain, including the cities of Oxnard, Port Hueneme, and Camarillo, California as well as adjacent unincorporated communities including El Rio, Somis, and Channel Islands Beach.  the superintendent is Dr. Tom McCoy.

History
The Oxnard Union High School District was established in 1901. Oxnard High School, the first school formed under the auspices of the district, opened the following year near downtown Oxnard.

From 1957 to 1974, Joseph W. Crosby served as OUHSD superintendent. During his tenure, the district experienced massive population growth. His first major undertaking as Superintendent was to staff and open the newly constructed Adolfo Camarillo High School. Crosby then immediately spearheaded an ambitious construction program funded by a school bond measure that enabled the building of several new high schools: Hueneme (opened 1959), Thousand Oaks (1962), Rio Mesa (1965), Channel Islands (1966), and Newbury Park (1967).

On July 1, 1974, the Conejo Valley Unified School District (CVUSD) was formed in Thousand Oaks from the easternmost territory of OUHSD. The new district took control of the two existing public high schools within its boundaries, Thousand Oaks and Newbury Park.

In 1995, OUHSD relocated Oxnard High School to a new site on Gonzales Road, the first comprehensive campus to open in three decades. This replaced the original location on Fifth Street, which has stood in the flight path of Oxnard Airport since 1934. The city of Oxnard purchased the old campus and converted it into a park.

Measure H, a $135 million bond measure, was passed by district voters in 2004 to build new high schools and make improvements to existing campuses. The bond paid for two new swimming pools for Camarillo and Hueneme high schools that were finished in 2014. A new magnet high school in Camarillo, Rancho Campana, was funded through the bond and completed in 2015. At the time of Rancho Campana's opening, OUHSD was searching for sites in Oxnard for two more new campuses. On November 13, 2019, the district's Board of Trustees voted to purchase land for one of these new schools, a  parcel in northeast Oxnard for $26.9 million. Named Del Sol High School, the campus is scheduled to open in 2022.

In 2018, Oxnard Union purchased a new headquarters building in northeast Oxnard jointly with the Rio School District. The offices on Solar Drive replace OUHSD's previous facilities on K Street which, like the old Oxnard High School, were also in the flight path of Oxnard Airport. The district sold the old headquarters and other surplus properties to help pay for the new headquarters.

Schools

Comprehensive schools
 Adolfo Camarillo High School
 Channel Islands High School
 Del Sol High School (opens in 2022)
 Hueneme High School
 Oxnard High School
 Pacifica High School
 Rio Mesa High School

Magnet schools
 Oxnard Middle College High School
 Rancho Campana High School

Alternative and continuation schools
 Condor High School Options Academy (comprises academy classrooms at Camarillo, Channel Islands, Hueneme, Oxnard, Pacifica, and Rio Mesa high schools)
 Frontier High School

Adult schools
 Oxnard Adult School

Charter schools
 Architecture, Construction & Engineering Charter High School (ACE Charter)
 Camarillo Academy of Progressive Education (CAPE, K—8)

Former schools
 Puente High School (2000–2009)
 Pacific View High School (1999–2007)

Feeder districts
 Hueneme School District
 Mesa Union School District
 Ocean View Elementary School District
 Oxnard Elementary School District
 Pleasant Valley School District
 Rio School District
 Somis Union School District

Sports

From 1998 to 2014, all of the comprehensive high schools in the Oxnard Union High School District played in the Pacific View League (PVL), which was formed to comprise the district schools. Prior to that establishment, Camarillo and Channel Islands participated in the Marmonte League, while Hueneme, Oxnard, and Rio Mesa were part of the Channel League. Pacifica High School joined the PVL when it opened its doors in 2001. In 2014, Camarillo left the league to join the new Coastal Canyon League, mostly comprising members of the Marmonte League. In 2018, Hueneme left the PVL to join the Citrus Coast League, a new circuit composed of several small public high schools.

References

External links

School districts in Ventura County, California
Education in Oxnard, California
School districts established in 1901
1901 establishments in California